Cinti may refer to:
Places
 Cincinnati, Ohio, United States
 Cinti, Bolivia:
 Nor Cinti Province
 Sud Cinti Province
People
 Laura Cinti, artist working with biology
 Laure Cinti-Damoreau (1801–- 25 February 1863), French opera singer
 Lucio Cinti (born 2000), Argentine rugby union player

Similar spellings
 Cinta
 Cintia